County municipality is a designation for an administrative division in Norway and in Canada.

See also 
County
Municipality

References

Types of administrative division